Asperula wimmeriana is a species of flowering plant in the family Rubiaceae. It was first described in 1928 and is endemic to south east Australia.

References 

wimmeriana